Heterotrichoncus is a monotypic genus of  dwarf spiders containing the single species, Heterotrichoncus pusillus. It was first described by J. Wunderlich in 1970, and has only been found in Albania, Austria, Czech Republic, France, Russia, Slovakia, and Spain.

See also
 List of Linyphiidae species (A–H)

References

Linyphiidae
Monotypic Araneomorphae genera
Spiders of Russia